Sues or SUES may refer to:

People 
 Hans-Dieter Sues, a German-born American paleontologist
 Alan Sues, an American actor and comedian

Organization 
 Shanghai University of Engineering Science, a public university in China

See also
 Sue (disambiguation)
 Suess (disambiguation)
 Suez (disambiguation)